The Siebenschneiderstein (Söbenschniedersteen) is a glacial erratic on the island of Rügen. It lies about 22 metres away from the cliffs of Gellort on the Baltic Sea beach, one kilometre northwest of Cape Arkona. It has a mass of 165 tonnes and a volume of 61 m³. It belongs, like about 20 other erratics, to the legally protected geotopes on the Island of Rügen.

The rock is not the biggest erratic on Rügen (that is the Buskam at 600 m³), but it is the fourth largest and marks the northern point of the island and hence the northernmost point of Eastern Germany.

See also 
 Glacial erratics on and around Rügen

References 

Geography of Rügen
Putgarten
Natural monuments in Mecklenburg-Western Pomerania
Glacial erratics of Germany